Xenurobrycon polyancistrus is a species of characid fish of the subfamily Glandulocaudinae. A freshwater fish, it is the smallest species of characin in its family and order. Adults can grow up to 1.4 cm long.

Distribution

Found in the gallery forest pools adjacent to rivers in savannah areas of the Rio Mamore and Rio Isiboro drainages in Bolivia.

It is also found in the Río Madre de Dios basin in Peru.

Discovery

It was found among a collection of fishes from Bolivia sent by Gerard Loubens of the Office de la Recherche Scientifique et Technique Outre-Mer, Laboratoire d'Ichthyologie de l'Universite de Trinidad, Estado Beni, Bolivia.

References

Characidae
Fish of Bolivia
Freshwater fish of Peru
Fish of the Amazon basin
Taxa named by Stanley Howard Weitzman
Fish described in 1987